Ambohidratrimo is a district of Analamanga in Madagascar.

Communes
The district is further divided into 24 communes:

 Ambato
 Ambatolampy Tsimahafotsy
 Ambohidratrimo
 Ambohimanjaka
 Ambohipihaonana
 Ambohitrimanjaka
 Ampangabe
 Ampanotokana
 Anjanadoria
 Anosiala
 Antanetibe
 Antehiroka
 Antsahafilo
 Avaratsena
 Fiadanana
 Iarinarivo
 Ivato Aeroport
 Ivato Firaisana
 Mahabo
 Mahereza
 Mahitsy
 Mananjara
 Manjakavaradrano
 Merimandroso
 Talatamaty

References 

Districts of Analamanga